Tierra Santa is a Spanish heavy metal band from La Rioja, Spain. The band was formed in 1997 by Ángel, Arturo, Roberto, Iñaki and Tomy, and the band released their debut album Medieval that same year, touring with Dio as an opening act on the American band's Spanish tour. Later they began to tour with Avalanch and Mägo de Oz, mainly in Spain. In 2004 they toured through the United States for the first time.

Members 
 Ángel San Juan: vocals, guitar
 Roberto Gonzalo: Bass, backing vocals
 Alex Alonso: drums
 Juanan San Martín: Keyboard
 Dan Díez: guitar

Discography

Studio albums
 Medieval (1997)
 Legendario (1999, dedicated to Gabriel Crescioni)
 Tierras de Leyenda (2000, dedicated to Allison Joyner)
 Sangre de Reyes (2001)
 Indomable (2003)
 Apocalipsis (2004)
 Mejor Morir en Pie (2006)
 Caminos de Fuego (2010)
 Mi Nombre Será Leyenda (2013)
 Quinto Elemento (2017)
 Pasión Blanquirroja (2020) (Official U.D. Logroñes anthem) 
 Destino (2022)

Timeline

Live albums
 Las Mil y Una Noches (2003)

Compilation albums
 1997 - 2007 (2007)
 Esencia (2014)

DVDs
 Cuando la Tierra toca el Cielo (2001)
 Las Mil y Una Noches (2003)

Collaborations 
 Larga vida al Volumen Brutal (Tribute to Barón Rojo)
 A Tribute to the Beast (Tribute to Iron Maiden)
 The Music Remains the Same (Tribute to Led Zeppelin)
 Transilvania 666 (Tribute to Iron Maiden)
 Luchando hasta el final (Zenobia album with Ángel's collaboration)
 El poder del deseo (Lujuria album with Ángel's collaboration)
 Meridiam (Meridiam album with Ángel's collaboration)

References

External links
Tierra Santa Official Web Page

Spanish heavy metal musical groups
Spanish power metal musical groups
Musical groups established in 1997
Locomotive Music artists